Agnathiellidae is a family of worms belonging to the order Bursovaginoidea.

Genera:
 Agnathiella Sterrer, 1971
 Paragnathiella Sterrer, 1997

References

Gnathostomulida
Platyzoa families